2-Chloro-5-hydroxyphenylglycine or CHPG is an agonist of the metabotropic glutamate receptors, specific for mGluR5.

It is capable of directly potentiating the depolarization of hippocampal CA1 neurons induced through NMDA administration.

References

Amino acids
Chlorobenzenes
Phenols
MGlu5 receptor agonists